is an anime series produced by Nippon Animation Co. Ltd.   It was first aired in Japan between October 29, 1977, and May 27, 1978, and is based on an original story by screenwriter Shun'ichi Yukimuro (as opposed to an existing manga).

While this series - Nippon Animation's first to target the shōjo audience, followed by Haikara-san ga Tōru - was taken off the air in Japan early due to mediocre ratings, it is a much-loved and well-known series in some European countries, particularly in Italy.

In the Philippines, it was aired by ABS-CBN in 1990s, Yey! in June 2017 and GMA Network in 2000s with some rebroadcasts since then and A2Z Channel, an ABS-CBN blocktime channel on January 18, 2021, every weekdays 4 pm (Philippine Standard Time, GMT+8) replacing Dog of Flanders:My Patrasche.
However, it is expected to air its final episode on February 26, 2021. It also aired on MBC in South Korea, France on Mangas (TV channel) and La Cinq, Cable Kin in Mexico, America Television in Peru, Super3 in Catalonia and Syndication in Italy.

Plot 

Charlotte was raised by her father, a former French nobleman, who is now living on a ranch in Quebec, Canada.

Although motherless, Charlotte was a happy girl until her 13th birthday, surrounded by a loving father and many friendly animals.  On that day, however, a package arrives from her “mother”, who was supposedly dead.

After Charlotte's father dies, this mother comes to live with her.  At the same time, Charlotte meets a strange boy.  This is only the beginning of many heartbreaking incidents in the little girl's life.

Original cast 

Ichirô Murakoshi as André Montburn father of Charlotte who is the founder of ranch in Quebec, Canada. He died in an accident due to inclement weather while traveling to harbor to meet Charlotte's mother
Ichirô Nagai as Grampa
Kaoru Kurosu as Cassie
Kazue Komiya as Satie
Keiko Yokozawa as Charlotte
Kôhei Miyauchi as Count
Osamu Kato as Garcon
Reiko Suzuki as Bella
Rokuro Naya as Knight
Toshiko Shimaki as Becky
Toshiya Ueda as Jean
Yasuo Muramatsu as Gordon
Yoshito Yasuhara as Sandy
Youko Matsuoka as Jim
Yūko Mita as Katie

Also in the cast are Simone, mother of Charlotte. Milan, Knight's wicked sister who is also hated Charlotte. Albert, Charlotte's wicked uncle. Marie, an adopted daughter of a French nobleman who has a deep hatred to Charlotte, Uncle Melville, an elder companion of Sandy who is fond of watching stars and was elected as a new captain in Charlotte's hometown, Louis, a sick nobleman who is Marie's fiancée

Episode list

Music

References

External links 
 Charlotte @ Nippon Animation
 
 
 Charlotte @ Animated Divots

1977 anime television series debuts
Anime with original screenplays
Asahi Broadcasting Corporation original programming
Nippon Animation
1977 Japanese television series debuts
1978 Japanese television series endings
Television shows set in Quebec
Television shows set in Canada
Television shows set in France
Television shows set in Paris
Fictional characters from Quebec
Historical anime and manga
Romance anime and manga
Shōjo manga